The 2014 Dow Corning Tennis Classic was a professional tennis tournament played on indoor hard courts. It was the 20th edition of the tournament and part of the 2014 ITF Women's Circuit, offering a total of $100,000 in prize money. It took place in Midland, Michigan, United States, on February 10–16, 2014.

Singles main draw entrants

Seeds 

 1 Rankings as of February 3, 2014

Other entrants 
The following players received wildcards into the singles main draw:
  Brooke Austin
  Tornado Alicia Black
  Lauren Davis
  Taylor Townsend

The following players received entry from the qualifying draw:
  Françoise Abanda
  Lena Litvak
  Alexandra Mueller
  Naomi Osaka

Champions

Singles 

  Heather Watson def.  Ksenia Pervak, 6–4, 6–0

Doubles 

  Anna Tatishvili /  Heather Watson def.  Sharon Fichman /  Maria Sanchez, 7–5, 5–7, [10–6]

External links 
 2014 Dow Corning Tennis Classic at ITFtennis.com
 Official website

2014